is a city located in Sorachi Subprefecture, Hokkaido, Japan.

As of September 2016, the city has an estimated population of 21,618, and the density of 41 persons per km2. The total area is 529.12 km2.

Fukagawa is a small but vibrant city most known for its plentiful rice fields and apple and cherry orchards in Otoe, a township to the south of the downtown area. Fukagawa is growing largely in Otoe, anchored by its Roadside Station, which is the third-busiest in Hokkaido, according to an article in the Hokkaido Shimbun.

Geography

Fukagawa is located on the Ishikari Plain, and is roughly an equal distance in between Asahikawa to the northeast, and Takikawa to the southwest.

Neighboring municipalities

Fukagawa borders on nine municipalities in Hokkaido Prefecture, spanning Sorachi, Kamikawa, and Rumoi subprefectures:

Sorachi Subprefecture
Ashibetsu
Akabira
Takikawa
Moseushi
Chippubetsu
Numata
Kamikawa Subprefecture
Asahikawa
Horokanai
Rumoi Subprefecture
Obira

Climate

History

Fukagawa was settled by the tondenhei, or the colonist militia, between 1895 and 1896.

1892 Fukagawa village was founded.
1915 Tadoshi village split off from Ichiyan village.
1918 Fukagawa village became Fukagawa town.
1962 Tadoshi village became Tadoshi town.
1963 Fukagawa town, Ichiyan village, Osamunai village, and Otoe village were merged to form Fukagawa city.
1970 Tadoshi town was merged into Fukagawa city.

Economy

The main economic activity of Fukugawa is rice production. Rice paddies in the city are irrigated by the Taishō Canal, which is channeled off the Ishikari River. Potatoes and apples are also agricultural products of the city.

Education

Junior college
Takushoku University Hokkaido Junior College

High schools

Public
 Hokkaido Fukagawa Nishi High School
 Hokkaido Fukagawa Higashi High School

Private
 Clark Memorial International High School

Transportation

Both trains and buses provide a direct link to the prefectural capital, Sapporo.

Rail
 JR Hokkaido Hakodate Main Line : Fukagawa - Osamunai
 JR Hokkaido Rumoi Main Line : Fukagawa - Kita-Ichiyan

Road
Hokkaido Expressway : Fukagawa IC
Fukagaw-Rumoi Expressway : Fukagawa-Nishi IC
Route 12

Sister city
 Abbotsford, British Columbia, Canada

Tourism
One of the main tourist attractions is Mount Kamui, a popular ski resort technically in Asahikawa, but only minutes away from Fukagawa by car or bus.

References

External links
Official Website 

 
Cities in Hokkaido
1963 establishments in Japan